Sudak Bay is a bay in the Black Sea near Sudak, Crimea.

References

Bays of Crimea
Bays of the Black Sea